Campo Alegre (Portuguese or Spanish: happy field) may refer to:

Campo Alegre, a neighbourhood in Caracas, Venezuela.
Campo Alegre, Oporto, a parish in Oporto, Portugal.
Campo Alegre, Alagoas, a Brazilian municipality in the state of Alagoas
Campo Alegre, Puerto Rico, a space for farmers' market in the District of Santurce
Campo Alegre, Santa Catarina, a Brazilian municipality in the state of Santa Catarina
Campo Alegre, an open-air brothel in Curaçao